SonarSource is a Swiss company founded in 2008. It develops open source software for continuous code quality and security.

Overview 
SonarSource is a company that develops open source software for continuous code quality and security. Founded by Olivier Gaudin, Freddy Mallet, and Simon Brandhof in 2008, SonarSource is headquartered in Geneva, Switzerland. 

In 2017, they had more than 6,000 customers, including eBay, Bank of America, BMW. 

As of 2022, SonarSource has more than 7 million users, 21,000 enterprise customers, and they now support more than 400,000 organizations.

Products 
SonarSource provides code quality and security products to detect maintainability, reliability and vulnerability issues on 27 programming languages including Python, Java, C#, JavaScript, C/C++, COBOL. The company offers three products: SonarQube, SonarCloud, and SonarLint.

 SonarQube is an open core product for static code analysis, with additional features offered in commercial editions. 
 SonarCloud offers free analysis of open source projects.
 SonarLint is a free IDE extension for static analysis.

Financial backing 
In 2016, the company raised  of funding from Insight Venture Partners, a US investment firm. In 2022, SonarSource received with CHF 394.6 million the second largest venture capital financing round of Switzerland of that year.

References 

2008 establishments in Switzerland
Software companies of Switzerland
Companies based in Geneva